Glyphipterix is a genus of sedge moths. It was described by Jacob Hübner in 1825.

Species

Glyphipterix achlyoessa
Glyphipterix acinacella Meyrick, 1882 (from Australia)
Glyphipterix acronoma
Glyphipterix acrothecta
Glyphipterix actinobola
Glyphipterix aenea
Glyphipterix aerifera
Glyphipterix affinis
Glyphipterix alpha
Glyphipterix amblycerella
Glyphipterix ametris
Glyphipterix amphipeda Meyrick, 1920 (South Africa)
Glyphipterix amphipoda
Glyphipterix amseli
Glyphipterix anaclastis (Meyrick, 1907) (Australia)
Glyphipterix angoonae Arita, 1983 (Thailand)Glyphipterix antidoxaGlyphipterix archimedica Meyrick, 1921 (South Africa)Glyphipterix argophracta Meyrick, 1926 (South Africa)Glyphipterix argyrea Arita, 1983 (Thailand)
Glyphipterix argyrelata
Glyphipterix argyroguttella
Glyphipterix argyromis Meyrick, 1907 (India & Sri Lanka)
Glyphipterix argyrosema
Glyphipterix argyrotoxa
Glyphipterix asterias
Glyphipterix asteriella Meyrick, 1880 (Australia)
Glyphipterix astrapaea
Glyphipterix ataracta
Glyphipterix atelura
Glyphipterix aulogramma
Glyphipterix autoglypta
Glyphipterix autopetes (Meyrick, 1907) (Australia)
Glyphipterix bactrias
Glyphipterix barbata
Glyphipterix basifasciata
Glyphipterix bergstraesserella (Fabricius, 1781) (from Europe)
Glyphipterix beta
Glyphipterix bicornis
Glyphipterix bifasciata
Glyphipterix bifasciella
Glyphipterix bizonata
Glyphipterix bohemani  (Zeller, 1852) (South Africa)
Glyphipterix brachydelta
Glyphipterix californiae (Walsingham, 1881) (North America)
Glyphipterix calliactis
Glyphipterix callicrossa (Meyrick, 1907) (Australia)
Glyphipterix callidelta
Glyphipterix calliscopa
Glyphipterix callithea Meyrick, 1921 (South Africa)
Glyphipterix canachodes
Glyphipterix carenota Meyrick, 1909 (India)
Glyphipterix caudatella
Glyphipterix cestrota
Glyphipterix chalcodaedala
Glyphipterix chalcostrepta
Glyphipterix chionosoma
Glyphipterix chrysallacta
Glyphipterix chrysoplanetis
Glyphipterix cionophora
Glyphipterix circumscriptella
Glyphipterix clearcha
Glyphipterix climacaspis Meyrick, 1920 (South Africa)
Glyphipterix codonias
Glyphipterix colorata
Glyphipterix columnaris
Glyphipterix cometophora
Glyphipterix compastis
Glyphipterix conosema
Glyphipterix convoluta
Glyphipterix cornigerella
Glyphipterix crinita
Glyphipterix crotalotis
Glyphipterix cultrata
Glyphipterix cyanochalca (Meyrick, 1882) (Australia)
Glyphipterix cyanophracta  (Meyrick, 1882) (Australia)
Glyphipterix danilevskii
Glyphipterix decachrysa Meyrick, 1918 (South Africa)
Glyphipterix deliciosa
Glyphipterix delta
Glyphipterix deltodes
Glyphipterix deuterastis (Meyrick, 1907) (Australia)
Glyphipterix diaphora
Glyphipterix dichalina  Meyrick, 1911 (Seychelles)
Glyphipterix dichorda
Glyphipterix diplotoxa  Meyrick, 1920 (South Africa)
Glyphipterix ditiorana (Walker, 1863) (India, Asia, Japan,South Africa, Mauritius)
Glyphipterix dolichophyes
Glyphipterix dolichophyses
Glyphipterix drosophaes
Glyphipterix enclitica
Glyphipterix epastra
Glyphipterix equitella
Glyphipterix erastis
Glyphipterix erebanassa
Glyphipterix euastera
Glyphipterix euthybelemna
Glyphipterix euleucotoma
Glyphipterix eumitrella
Glyphipterix expurgata
Glyphipterix falcigera
Glyphipterix formosametron
Glyphipterix formosensis
Glyphipterix forsterella (Fabricius, 1781) (Europe, Caucasus, Japan)
Glyphipterix fortunatella Walsingham, 1908 (Canary islands)
Glyphipterix funditrix
Glyphipterix fuscoviridella
Glyphipterix gamma
Glyphipterix gaudialis
Glyphipterix gemmatella  (Walker, 1864) (Congo, Gabon, Sierra Leone, Uganda)
Glyphipterix gemmipunctella
Glyphipterix gemmula
Glyphipterix gianelliella
Glyphipterix gonoteles (Meyrick, 1907) (Australia)
Glyphipterix grandis Arita & Heppner, 1992
Glyphipterix grapholithoides (Walsingham, 1891) (South Africa, Congo)
Glyphipterix gypsonota
Glyphipterix halimophilaMey, 1991 (Philippines)
Glyphipterix hannemanni 
Glyphipterix haplographa
Glyphipterix harpogramma
Glyphipterix haworthana (Stephens, 1834) (North America)
Glyphipterix hemipempta
Glyphipterix heptaglyphella
Glyphipterix holodesma
Glyphipterix hologramma
Glyphipterix hyperlampra
Glyphipterix idiomorpha Meyrick, 1917 (South Africa)
Glyphipterix imparfasciata
Glyphipterix indomita
Glyphipterix invicta
Glyphipterix iocheaera
Glyphipterix ioclista
Glyphipterix iometalla Meyrick, 1880 (Australia)
Glyphipterix isoclista
Glyphipterix isozela (Meyrick, 1907) (Australia)
Glyphipterix issikii
Glyphipterix japonicella
Glyphipterix juncivora Heppner, 198 (North America)
Glyphipterix lamprocoma (Meyrick, 1907) (Australia)
Glyphipterix lamprosema
Glyphipterix leptocona
Glyphipterix leptosema 
Glyphipterix leucocerastes
Glyphipterix leucophragma
Glyphipterix leucoplaca
Glyphipterix lineovalvae
Glyphipterix loricatella (Treitschke, 1833) (from Hungary)
Glyphipterix lunaris
Glyphipterix luteocapitella
Glyphipterix luteomaculata
Glyphipterix lycnophora
Glyphipterix macrantha
Glyphipterix macraula (Meyrick, 1907) (Australia)
Glyphipterix macrodrachma
Glyphipterix maculata
Glyphipterix madagascariensis Viette, 1951 (Madagascar, Réunion)
Glyphipterix magnatella
Glyphipterix marinae
Glyphipterix maritima
Glyphipterix marmaropa
Glyphipterix maschalis
Glyphipterix medica Meyrick, 1911 (Seychelles & South Africa)
Glyphipterix melania
Glyphipterix mesaula (Meyrick, 1907) (Australia)
Glyphipterix metasticta
Glyphipterix meteora
Glyphipterix metron
Glyphipterix metronoma (Meyrick, 1907) (Australia)
Glyphipterix mikadonis
Glyphipterix miniata
Glyphipterix molybdastra  Meyrick, 1923 (from Angola)
Glyphipterix molybdora
Glyphipterix monodonta
Glyphipterix montisella Chambers, 1875 (North America)
Glyphipterix morangella
Glyphipterix moriutii Arita, 1983 (Thailand)Glyphipterix necopinaGlyphipterix neochordaGlyphipterix nephopteraGlyphipterix nicaeella Möschler, 1866 (from Europe)Glyphipterix nigromarginataGlyphipterix nugellaGlyphipterix octatomaGlyphipterix octonariaGlyphipterix okuiGlyphipterix oligastraGlyphipterix orthodetaGlyphipterix ortholeuca Meyrick, 1921 (South Africa)Glyphipterix orthomachaGlyphipterix orymagdisGlyphipterix oxycopis Meyrick, 1918 (India, Sri Lanka)Glyphipterix oxymachaeraGlyphipterix oxytricha Meyrick, 1928 (South AfricaGlyphipterix palaeomorphaGlyphipterix palpellaGlyphipterix paradiseaGlyphipterix parazonaGlyphipterix perfractaGlyphipterix perimetallaGlyphipterix persica Diakonoff, 1979 (Iran)Glyphipterix pertenuis  Diakonoff, 1979 (Tunesia)Glyphipterix pharetropisGlyphipterix phosphora  (Meyrick, 1907) (Australia)Glyphipterix plagiographa  Bradley, 1965 (Uganda)Glyphipterix platydisemaGlyphipterix platyochraGlyphipterix polychroaGlyphipterix polyzelaGlyphipterix protomacra (Meyrick, 1907) (Australia)Glyphipterix protoscleriaeGlyphipterix pseudogammaGlyphipterix pseudomelaniaGlyphipterix pseudostomaGlyphipterix pseudotaiwanaGlyphipterix psychopaGlyphipterix purpurea Arita, 1983 (Thailand)
Glyphipterix pygmaeella
Glyphipterix pyrogastra
Glyphipterix pyrophora
Glyphipterix quadragintapunctata
Glyphipterix refractella
Glyphipterix regula
Glyphipterix reikoae
Glyphipterix rhanteria
Glyphipterix rhinoceropa  Meyrick, 1935 (from China)
Glyphipterix rhodanis
Glyphipterix rugata
Glyphipterix sabella Newman, 1856 (Australia)
Glyphipterix saurodonta
Glyphipterix schoenicolella
Glyphipterix scintilella
Glyphipterix scintilla
Glyphipterix scleriae
Glyphipterix sclerodes Meyrick, 1909 (Sri Lanka)
Glyphipterix scolias
Glyphipterix semiflavana
Glyphipterix semilunaris Wollaston E., 1879 (from St.Helena)
Glyphipterix semisparsa
Glyphipterix septemstrigella
Glyphipterix siamensis Arita, 1983 (Thailand)Glyphipterix silvestris Arita, 1983 (Thailand)
Glyphipterix similis
Glyphipterix simplicella
Glyphipterix simpliciella
Glyphipterix sistes Heppner, 1985 (North America)
Glyphipterix speculiferella
Glyphipterix stasichlora
Glyphipterix stelucha  Meyrick, 1909 (from South Africa)
Glyphipterix stilata
Glyphipterix sulcosa
Glyphipterix synarma
Glyphipterix syndecta
Glyphipterix synorista
Glyphipterix taiwana
Glyphipterix tenuis
Glyphipterix tetrachrysa Meyrick, 1907 (Sri Lanka)
Glyphipterix tetrasema
Glyphipterix thrasonella (Scopoli, 1763) (from Europe)
Glyphipterix tona
Glyphipterix trigonaspis
Glyphipterix trigonodes
Glyphipterix tripedila
Glyphipterix triplaca
Glyphipterix triselena
Glyphipterix tungella
Glyphipterix umbilici M. Hering, 1927 (Portugal)
Glyphipterix uncta
Glyphipterix unguifera
Glyphipterix urticae Heppner, 1985 (USA)
Glyphipterix unifasciata
Glyphipterix variata
Glyphipterix versicolor
Glyphipterix virgata
Glyphipterix voluptella
Glyphipterix xanthoplecta
Glyphipterix xestobela
Glyphipterix xyridota
Glyphipterix zalodisca
Glyphipterix zelota

Selected former species
Glyphipterix plenella

References

Arita, 1983. Six New Species of Glyphipterix HUBNER (Lepidoptera, Glyphipterigidae) from Thailand.

External links

  Glyphipterix at Global Species
 Glyphipterix at Afromoths)
Australian Glyphipterix

Glyphipterigidae
Moth genera
Taxa named by Jacob Hübner